Khuban may refer to:

 Khuban, Iran
 Khuban, Yemen